Păstrăveni is a commune in Neamț County, Western Moldavia, Romania. It is composed of four villages: Lunca Moldovei, Păstrăveni, Rădeni and Spiești.

References

Communes in Neamț County
Localities in Western Moldavia